Svatý Mikuláš is a municipality and village in Kutná Hora District in the Central Bohemian Region of the Czech Republic. It has about 900 inhabitants. It is known for the Kačina Castle.

Administrative parts
Villages of Lišice, Sulovice and Svatá Kateřina are administrative parts of Svatý Mikuláš. Lišice and Sulovice form an exclave of the municipal territory.

Geography
It lies in the Central Elbe Table. The Elbe River briefly flows through the northern part of the municipal territory.

History
The first written mention of Svatý Mikuláš is from 1307.

Sights
Svatý Mikuláš is known for the Kačina Castle, protected as a national cultural monument. It is considered the msot important Czech building in the Empire style. It was built in 1802–1823 and consists of three parts, the main building and two wings. Today it is used by National Museum of Agriculture, which opened here the Czech Countryside Museum. In the left wing is a never-finished castle chapel and a castle theatre completed in the middle of the 19th century. In the right wing is the Chotek Library with more than 40,000 volumes of educational and beautiful literature from the 16th–19th centuries.

The Church of Saint Nicholas probably dates from the turn of the 13th and 14th centuries. It is a Gothic church with neo-Gothic modifications from 1872.

Gallery

References

External links

Villages in Kutná Hora District